Zha is the Mandarin pinyin romanization of the Chinese surname written  in Chinese character. It is romanized as Cha in Wade–Giles. Zha is listed 397th in the Song dynasty classic text Hundred Family Surnames. As of 2008, it is the 176th most common surname in China, shared by 680,000 people. It was originated as a branch of the Jiang (姜) surname. Zha was originally the name of a district in modern-day Shandong province.

Notable people
 Zha Jizuo (1601–1676), Ming and Qing dynasty scholar
 Zha Shibiao (1615–1698), Ming and Qing dynasty landscape painter
 Zha Sheng (查昇; 1650–1707), Qing dynasty calligrapher
 Zha Shenxing (1650–1727), Qing dynasty poet
 Zha Sili (查嗣瑮; 1652–1733), Qing dynasty scholar, brother of Zha Shenxing
 Zha Siting (查嗣庭; died 1727), Qing dynasty scholar-official, victim of the literary Inquisition, brother of Zha Shenxing
 Zha Weiren (查为仁; 1695–1749), Qing dynasty poet
 Zha Kui (查揆; 1770–1834), Qing dynasty poet
 Zha Fuxi (1895–1976), guqin player and scholar, aviator
 Zha Qian (查谦; 1896–1975), physicist, first president of Huazhong University of Science and Technology
 Cha Liang-chao (1897–1982), Republic of China educator
 Cha Liang-chien (查良鑑; 1904–1994), Republic of China Minister of Justice, brother of Cha Liang-chao
 Cha Chi Ming (1914–2007), entrepreneur and philanthropist
 Mu Dan or Zha Liangzheng (1918–1977), poet
 Louis Cha Leung-yung or Zha Liangyong, Jin Yong (:zh:查良鏞; 1924–2018), wuxia novelist with over 100 million copies of his works sold worldwide
 Zha Quanxing (1925–2019), chemist, member of the Chinese Academy of Sciences, son of Zha Qian
 Cha Mou Sing (查懋聲; born 1943), chairman of HKR International, son of Cha Chi Ming
 Zha Peixin (查培新; born 1946), Chinese ambassador to Canada and the United Kingdom
 Laura Cha (查史美倫, born 1949, original name Shih May-lung), Hong Kong businesswoman and politician, wife of Cha Mou Zing
 Cha Mou Zing (born 1950), vice-chairman of HKR International, son of Cha Chi Ming
 Zha Jianguo (查建国; born 1953), dissident, cofounder of the Democracy Party of China
 Cha Chuen Yee (查傳誼; born 1956), Hong Kong film director and producer
 Zha Jianying (born 1959), Chinese-American journalist and writer
 Hai Zi or Zha Haisheng (1964–1989), poet
 Zha Jie (born 1994), actor and model

References

Chinese-language surnames

Individual Chinese surnames